Below are the rosters of the minor league affiliates of the Philadelphia Phillies:

Players

Andrew Baker

Andrew Baker (born March 24, 2000) is an American professional baseball pitcher in the Philadelphia Phillies organization.

Baker began his college baseball career at Chipola College. As a freshman, he made 26 appearances and finished the season with a 2-1 record with seven saves and a 5.04 ERA. Baker was also selected in the 16th round of the 2019 Major League Baseball Draft by the Los Angeles Dodgers, but opted not to sign and instead transferred to Auburn. As a sophomore at Auburn he had 9.53 earned run average in 5.2 innings pitched over six relief appearances before the season was cut short due to the coronavirus pandemic. After the school year, Baker transferred back to Chipola College. He made 15 starts and went 7-2 with a 3.45 ERA and 92 strikeouts in  innings pitched.

Baker was selected by the Philadelphia Phillies in the 11th round of the 2021 Major League Baseball Draft. After signing, he was assigned to the Rookie-level Florida Complex League Phillies, where he made two appearances before being promoted to the Low-A Clearwater Threshers. Baker began the 2022 season with the High-A Jersey Shore BlueClaws before being promoted to the Reading Fightin Phils of the Double-A Eastern League.

Auburn Tigers bio

Colton Eastman

Colton Eastman (born August 22, 1996) is an American professional baseball pitcher in the Philadelphia Phillies organization. He played collegiately for Cal State Fullerton.

Eastman attended Central High School in Fresno, California and was drafted in the 15th round of the 2015 Major League Baseball Draft by the Minnesota Twins. He did not sign with the team and opted to continue his career at California State University, Fullerton.

As a freshman, Eastman posted an 8–3 record with a 2.24 earned run average (ERA) for the Titans, earning Freshman All-American honors and Collegiate Baseball Newspapers Freshman Pitcher of the Year award. He was also 2016 Baseball America Freshman All-American, First Team, 2016 Louisville Slugger National Freshman Pitcher of the Year, 2016 Louisville Slugger All-American, Third Team, 2016 NCBWA Freshman All-American, First Team, 2016 Big West Conference Freshman Pitcher of the Year, and 2016 Big West Conference First Team All Conference.

In his sophomore season, he went 2–0 with a 2.14 ERA in nine games (seven starts) in an injury-shortened campaign. During his junior year, Eastman went 10–4 with a 2.37 ERA and 124 strikeouts and threw a no-hitter. Eastman was a consensus second team All-America selection.

Eastman was selected by the Philadelphia Phillies in the 4th round of the 2018 Major League Baseball draft. He signed with the Phillies, receiving a $522,900 signing bonus. Eastman made his professional debut with the Williamsport Crosscutters, going 0–2 with a 3.00 ERA in eight starts, and 23 strikeouts in 18 innings.

Eastman began 2019 with the Lakewood BlueClaws. He was promoted to the High-A Clearwater Threshers of the Florida State League after going 1–2 with one save, 25 strikeouts and a 6.00 ERA in five appearances (21 innings pitched) for the Blueclaws. He did not play a minor league game in 2020 due to the cancellation of the minor league season caused by the COVID-19 pandemic.

Hao Yu LeeHao Yu Lee (born February 3, 2003) is a Taiwanese professional baseball infielder in the Philadelphia Phillies organization.

Lee played on the Chinese Taipei national baseball team in multiple international tournaments, including the World Baseball Softball Confederation U-12 Baseball World Cup, U-15 Baseball World Cup, and U-18 Baseball World Cup.

Lee was signed by the Philadelphia Phillies as an international free agent on June 15, 2021, and received a $500,000 signing bonus. After signing, he was assigned to the Rookie-level Florida Complex League Phillies, where he played in nine games and batted .364 with one home run, two doubles, two triples, and five RBIs. Lee was assigned to the Clearwater Threshers of the Single-A Florida State League at the beginning of the 2022 season.

James McArthurJames L. McArthur (born December 11, 1996) is an American professional baseball pitcher in the Philadelphia Phillies organization.

McArthur played college baseball at the University of Mississippi. He was drafted by the Philadelphia Phillies in the 12th round of the 2018 Major League Baseball Draft. The Phillies added him to their 40-man roster after the 2021 season.

McArthur was optioned to the Triple-A Lehigh Valley IronPigs to begin the 2023 season.

Griff McGarryGriffin Thomas McGarry (born June 8, 1999) is an American professional baseball pitcher in the Philadelphia Phillies organization.

McGarry grew up in Portola Valley, California and attended the Menlo School in Atherton, California. He was selected in 31st round by the Texas Rangers in 2017 Major League Baseball draft, but opted not to sign with the team.

McGarry played college baseball at Virginia. He posted an 8.15 ERA in 11 appearances as a freshman. Following the season, he played collegiate summer baseball with the Keene Swamp Bats of the New England Collegiate Baseball League. McGarry was named the Cavaliers' opening day starter going into his sophomore season and went 3–5 with a 4.56 ERA. After the 2019 season he played for the Hyannis Harbor Hawks in the Cape Cod Baseball League. As a junior, McGarry went 3–0 with a 1.35 ERA and 31 strikeouts in 20 innings pitched before the season was cut short due to the coronavirus pandemic. As a senior, he struggled with his control at the start of the season and lost his spot in Virginia's starting rotation. He regained form in the second half of the season after striking out eight batters in 3.1 innings against Old Dominion and finished the season with an 0–5 record with a 5.44 ERA, 69 strikeouts and 42 walks in 43 innings pitched. McGarry was selected by the Philadelphia Phillies in the 5th round of the 2021 Major League Baseball Draft.

McGarry began his professional career with the Low-A Clearwater Threshers. He was promoted to the High-A Jersey Shore BlueClaws and finished the season with 1–0 record with one save and a 2.96 ERA and 43 strikeouts in  innings pitched.

Virginia Cavaliers bio

Jhailyn OrtizJhailyn David Ortiz Rosado (born November 18, 1998) is a Dominican professional baseball outfielder in the Philadelphia Phillies organization.

Ortiz was considered one of the top international free agents in the 2015 class. He signed with the Philadelphia Phillies for $4.2 million in July of that year.

Ortiz made his professional debut in 2016 with the Gulf Coast Phillies and batted .231 with eight home runs and 27 RBIs in 47 games. He played in 2017 with the Williamsport Crosscutters, where he greatly improved off of his debut season, posting a .302 batting average, eight home runs and 30 RBIs along with a .401 OBP and a .961 OPS in the same number of games as 2016. In 2018 with Lakewood he batted .225/.297/.375 with 13 home runs and 47 RBIs.

For the 2019 season, Ortiz spent the year with the High-A Clearwater Threshers, slashing .200/.272/.381 with 19 home runs and 65 RBI in 115 games. Ortiz did not play in a game in 2020 due to the cancellation of the minor league season because of the COVID-19 pandemic. In 2021, Ortiz split the season between the High-A Jersey Shore BlueClaws and the Double-A Reading Fightin Phils, hitting a combined .250/.346/.488 with 23 home runs and 54 RBI in 95 games between the two teams. He was selected to the 40-man roster following the season on November 19, 2021.

Ortiz was optioned to the Triple-A Lehigh Valley IronPigs to begin the 2023 season.

Tyler PhillipsTyler Nicholas Phillips (born October 27, 1997) is an American professional baseball pitcher in the Philadelphia Phillies organization.

Phillips attended Bishop Eustace Preparatory School in Pennsauken Township, New Jersey. He was drafted by the Texas Rangers in the 16th round of the 2015 MLB draft. He signed with them for a $160,000 signing bonus, forgoing a commitment to State College of Florida, Manatee–Sarasota.

After signing, Phillips was assigned to the AZL Rangers of the Rookie-level Arizona League to make his professional debut; in 15 innings pitched for them, he posted a 0–1 record with a 3.60 ERA. In 2016, he made 13 starts for Spokane Indians of the Class A Short Season Northwest League, going 4–7 with a 6.44 ERA, while striking out 57 in  innings. He split 2017 between Spokane and Hickory Crawdads of the Class A South Atlantic League, going a combined 5–4 with a 4.21 ERA in 20 games (17 starts). In 2018 he went 11–5 with a 2.67 ERA with the Hickory, striking out 124 in 128 innings. He earned a spot on the South Atlantic League mid-season all-star team. Phillips finished the season with the Down East Wood Ducks of the Class A-Advanced Carolina League, going 1–0 with a 1.80 ERA. Phillips was the recipient of the 2018 Texas Rangers Nolan Ryan Pitcher of the Year award.

Prior to the 2019 season, Phillips was rated by Baseball America as having the best control tool in minor league baseball. Phillips was assigned back to Down East to open the 2019 season, and went 2–2 with a 1.19 ERA in  innings for them. On May 10, he was promoted to the Frisco RoughRiders of the Double-A Texas League. With Frisco, Phillips went 7–9 with a 4.73 ERA over  innings.

Phillips was added to the Rangers 40-man roster following the 2019 season. Phillips did not play in a game in 2020 due to the cancellation of the Minor League Baseball season because of the COVID-19 pandemic. He opened the 2021 season back with Frisco. Phillips was designated for assignment on July 17, 2021, after struggling to a 1–5 record and 6.75 ERA in 10 games between Frisco and the Triple-A Round Rock Express.

On July 24, 2021, Phillips was claimed off waivers by the Philadelphia Phillies. Phillips was designated for assignment by Philadelphia on September 20, 2021. He was released by Philadelphia the following day. On November 6, Phillips re-signed with the Phillies on a minor league contract.

Gabriel RinconesGabriel Rincones Jr. (born March 3, 2001) is an American professional baseball outfielder in the Philadelphia Phillies organization.

Rincones was born in Boynton Beach, Florida to Venezuelan parents and his family moved to Venezuela shortly after he was born. His family relocated to Scotland when he was six years old after his father was hired as an offshore safety advisor in the oil industry. Rincones moved back to Venezuela at age 12 to play baseball and lived with an aunt before moving to live with another aunt in Tampa, Florida.

Rincones played junior college baseball at St. Petersburg College. As a freshman, he batted .432 with 11 doubles, four home runs and 28 RBIs. Rincones was named the Florida State College Activities Association (FCSAA) Player of the Year after hitting for a .415 average with 19 doubles, six home runs, and 43 RBIs during his sophomore season. He also committed to transfer to Florida Atlantic University (FAU) for his remaining eligibility. Rincones drafted by the San Diego Padres in the 19th round of the 2021 Major League Baseball draft, but opted not to sign with the team. After the season, he played on the Great Britain national baseball team in the 2021 European Baseball Championship. In his only season playing for the FAU Owls, Rincones batted .346 with 19 home runs and 69 RBIs and was named the Conference USA Newcomer of the Year.

Rincones was selected in the third round of the 2022 Major League Baseball draft by the Philadelphia Phillies.

FAU Owls bio

Johan RojasJohan Stiven Rojas (born August 14, 2000) is a Dominican professional baseball outfielder in the Philadelphia Phillies organization.

Rojas signed with the Philadelphia Phillies as an international free agent in January 2018. He made his professional debut with the Dominican Summer League Phillies. In 2019, he played for the Gulf Coast Phillies and Williamsport Crosscutters.

Due to the cancellation of the 2020 Minor League Baseball season due to COVID-19, Rojas did not play for a team. He returned in 2021 to play for the Florida Complex League Phillies, Clearwater Threshers and Jersey Shore Blue Claws.

He played in the 2022 Arizona Fall League, where he batted .310/.423/.452, and was second in the league with 13 stolen bases, without being caught.

Rojas was optioned to the Double-A Reading Fightin Phils to begin the 2023 season.

Jordan ViarsJordan Viars (born July 18, 2003) is an American baseball outfielder in the Philadelphia Phillies organization.

Viars grew up in Frisco, Texas and attended Reedy High School. As a senior, he batted .464 with eight home runs and 26 RBIs. Viars had committed to play college baseball at Arkansas prior to signing with the Phillies.

Viars was selected in the third round of the 2021 Major League Baseball draft by the Philadelphia Phillies. After signing with the team he was assigned to the Rookie-level Florida Complex League Phillies, where he slashed .255/.406/.468 in 64 plate appearances. Viars missed the beginning of the 2022 season due to an ankle injury. He was sent to the FCL Phillies on a rehab assignment in June before joining the Clearwater Threshers of the Single-A Florida State League.

Weston WilsonWeston Graham Wilson' (born September 11, 1994) is an American professional baseball infielder for the Philadelphia Phillies organization.

Wilson attended Wesleyan Christian Academy in High Point, North Carolina, and Clemson University, where he played college baseball for the Clemson Tigers.

The Milwaukee Brewers selected Wilson in the 17th round, with the 501st overall selection, of the 2016 MLB draft. In 2021, when he was playing for the Nashville Sounds, he developed a blood clot in his right shoulder. After having surgery, he played in the Arizona Fall League that year. He returned to Nashville in 2022. He became a free agent after the season and the Phillies invited him to spring training in 2023.

Full Triple-A to Rookie League rosters

Triple-A

Double-A

High-A

Single-A

Rookie

Foreign Rookie

See also
 Paul Owens Award

References

Minor

Lists of minor league baseball players